Bagnolo Mella is a comune and town in the province of Brescia, in Lombardy.

Transportation 
Bagnolo Mella has a railway station on the Brescia–Cremona line.

Twin towns
Bagnolo Mella is twinned with:

  Brie-Comte-Robert, France
  Stadtbergen, Germany

References

Cities and towns in Lombardy